Whychus Creek is a tributary of the Deschutes River in Deschutes and Jefferson counties in the U.S. state of Oregon. Formerly named Squaw Creek, considered derogatory in the 21st century, it was renamed in 2006. Explorer John C. Frémont camped along the stream in 1843 but did not identify it by name. Robert S. Williamson, a surveyor who camped there in 1855, said its Indian (Native American) name was Why-chus.

Course
Flowing generally north through the Three Sisters Wilderness, the stream plunges over  Upper Chush Falls before receiving Park Creek from the left and plunging over  Chush Falls. Downstream of the waterfalls, the creek receives South Fork and North Fork from the left and Snow Creek from the right.

Turning northeast, the creek intersects Whychus Creek Canal, which diverts water to McKenzie Canyon Reservoir and other parts of the Three Sisters Irrigation District. Flowing by the southeast side of the city of Sisters, Whychus Creek passes under U.S. Route 20 and Oregon Route 126, which overlap in this vicinity, before receiving Indian Ford Creek from the left. Continuing northeast, the creek leaves Deschutes County and enters Jefferson County and the Crooked River National Grassland.

See also

 List of rivers of Oregon

References

External links

Photos of the creek by Ian Sane
Real-time flow data, Whychus Creek – United States Bureau of Reclamation 
Whychus Creek Restoration – Oregon Public Broadcasting news story and Oregon Field Guide video

Rivers of Deschutes County, Oregon
Rivers of Jefferson County, Oregon
Sisters, Oregon
Rivers of Oregon
Wild and Scenic Rivers of the United States
Oregon placenames of Native American origin